Boubker El-Afoui (born 1 January 1969) is a Moroccan long-distance runner. He competed in the men's marathon at the 2000 Summer Olympics.

References

External links

1969 births
Living people
Athletes (track and field) at the 2000 Summer Olympics
Moroccan male long-distance runners
Moroccan male marathon runners
Olympic athletes of Morocco
Place of birth missing (living people)